Rıfat Yıldız (born 1 April 1965 in Yenigazi, Turkey) is a German wrestler. He won a silver medal at the 1992 Summer Olympics.

References

External links
 

1965 births
Living people
Olympic wrestlers of West Germany
Olympic wrestlers of Germany
Wrestlers at the 1988 Summer Olympics
Wrestlers at the 1992 Summer Olympics
Wrestlers at the 1996 Summer Olympics
Wrestlers at the 2000 Summer Olympics
German male sport wrestlers
Olympic silver medalists for Germany
German people of Turkish descent
Olympic medalists in wrestling
World Wrestling Championships medalists
Medalists at the 1992 Summer Olympics
20th-century German people
21st-century German people